Alex Weiser is an American composer of contemporary classical music.

Biography
Weiser was born in New York City to a Jewish family. He attended Stuyvesant High School and Yale University, and received a master's degree in Music Theory and Composition from New York University. He studied with Paul Alan Levi, Martin Bresnick, Michael Gordon, and Julia Wolfe among others.

Weiser's debut album, and all the days were purple, was released by Cantaloupe Music in April 2019, and was named a 2020 Finalist for the Pulitzer Prize for Music. The album features singer Eliza Bagg singing songs set to poetry in Yiddish and English by poets including Anna Margolin, Rachel Korn, Abraham Sutzkever, Emily Dickinson, and William Carlos Williams. Probing contemporary Jewish identity, the album grew out of Weiser's work as the Director of Public Programs at the YIVO Institute for Jewish Research.

Other of Weiser's works explore Jewish themes as well including an opera, State of the Jews, which is a historical drama about Theodor Herzl, and after shir hashirim for chamber orchestra which takes its inspiration from the biblical Song of Songs. Common themes in Weiser's work also include death and transience as exemplified by his work Three Epitaphs. Other major works have included shimmer for eight spatially arrayed cellos written for and recorded by Ashley Bathgate as a companion piece to Steve Reich's Cello Counterpoint, and water hollows stone for piano four hands, written for HOCKET.

In addition to his work as a composer and at YIVO, Weiser is co-founder and artistic director of Kettle Corn New Music, and worked for about five years as the Director of Operations and Development at the MATA Festival.

References

External links

Artist Page, Cantaloupe Music

Year of birth missing (living people)
Musicians from New York City
Living people
Stuyvesant High School alumni
Yale University alumni
New York University alumni
Male opera composers
21st-century American composers
21st-century American male musicians
American classical composers
American male classical composers
American opera composers
Jewish American classical composers
Jewish opera composers
Jewish classical composers
21st-century American Jews